Phyllomya procera is a species of fly in the family Tachinidae.

Distribution
Andorra, France, Germany, Greece, Italy, Poland, Sicily, Spain and Switzerland

References

Diptera of Europe
Dexiinae
Insects described in 1824
Taxa named by Johann Wilhelm Meigen